Thomas Eden, (29 November 1787 – 4 November 1845) was the Secretary to the Governor of Ceylon (now Sri Lanka), Treasurer of Ceylon (1816–1822), Commissioner of Stamps, and a member of the Executive and Legislative Councils.

Eden was born in England on 29 November 1787, the oldest son of Thomas Eden (1745–1805), the deputy auditor of Greenwich Hospital, and Marina née Jones (1750–?). Eden's father, Thomas, was the fourth son of the third Baronet of West Auckland. On 4 January 1810 he married Frances Elizabeth (?–1879) the daughter of Hon. John Rodney (Colonial Secretary of Ceylon 1806–1833) in Colombo.

References

1787 births
1845 deaths
People from British Ceylon
Sri Lankan people of British descent
Treasurers of Ceylon